Kangiqsujuaq (Wakeham Bay) Airport  is located  southeast of Kangiqsujuaq, Quebec, Canada.

Airlines and destinations

References

External links

Certified airports in Nord-du-Québec